One City Center is an office building located in the in Monument Square, Portland, Maine. It is considered an icon of the Maine financial market. The building serves as the northern New England offices for Bank of America, and a Bank of America logo is featured at the building's highest point. It consists of 13 floors and features a 5-story atrium with a full service food court inside the building. The building was opened in 1987.

External links
 Profile of One City Center emporis.com

Office buildings in Portland, Maine
Skyscraper office buildings in Maine
Office buildings completed in 1987
1987 establishments in Maine